Don Rigters (born 6 March 1992) is a Dutch retired basketball player.

In his first two professional seasons, Rigters played for Challenge Sports Rotterdam. For 2014–15 he signed with Port of Den Helder Kings. In December 2014 Kings went bankrupt and the team was dissolved.

In popular culture
In 2016 Rigters appeared in the music video "What Is Love 2016" by Belgian DJ Lost Frequencies In the video directed by Soulvizion, he plays the role of David, a basketball player who is severely injured and is trying to make a comeback to the game.

References

External links
 eurobasket.com profile

1992 births
Living people
Den Helder Kings players
Dutch Basketball League players
Dutch expatriate basketball people in the United States
Dutch men's basketball players
Pensacola State Pirates men's basketball players
People from Binnenmaas
Point guards
Feyenoord Basketball players
Shooting guards
Sportspeople from South Holland
21st-century Dutch people